Brigadier General Trần Văn Hai (1927-1975) was an officer in the Army of the Republic of Vietnam. He was born in Cần Thơ.

Military service

In 1951, Hai graduated from the Dalat Military Academy, Class 7.

In 1968, he was commanding the Ranger Branch Command, directly supervising the Ranger's raid to clear the enemy force that infiltrated into the business quarter of Cho Lon area. He was then assigned National Police Chief.

He was the commander of the 7th Infantry Division at Dong Tam, near Mỹ Tho.

In 1970, he was commander, Special Tactical Area 44, before commanding the 7th Division. He was renowned for being incorruptible, outspoken and brave. 

On April 30, 1975, at midnight he committed suicide at the Division Headquarters, Đồng Tâm Base Camp. His motives are unknown, but according to NY Times, General Hai feared persecution due to the humiliation of surrendering to VC divisions outside at the NH4 (now National Route 1A). General Hai is one of the five ARVN generals who committed suicide to avoid a humiliating surrender to VC/NVA soldiers.

References

External links

1927 births
1975 deaths
Army of the Republic of Vietnam generals
South Vietnamese military personnel of the Vietnam War
Deaths by firearm in Vietnam
People from Cần Thơ
Vietnamese military personnel who committed suicide